The Secretary of New South Wales (NSW) Health is the chief executive of the NSW Ministry of Health. The Secretary oversees the day-to-day operation of the Ministry and directly reports to the Minister for Health.

The Secretary has overall operational responsibility for the management and oversight of the NSW Ministry of Health. The Secretary chairs critical management meetings for the system and meets with chief executives from the entire state health system, among others.

History
The inaugural Director-General (Secretary) of NSW Health was Robert Thomas Paton, who was appointed in 1913.

Functions
The functions and responsibilities of the Secretary for NSW Health are defined per section 122 of the NSW Health Services Act 1997. These are:
(a) to facilitate the achievement and maintenance of adequate standards of patient care within public hospitals and in relation to other services provided by the public health system,
(b) to facilitate the efficient and economic operation of the public health system consistent with the standards referred to in paragraph (a),
(c) to inquire into the administration, management and services of any public health organisation, 
(c1) to provide governance, oversight and control of the public health system and the statutory health organisations within it,
(d) to cause public health organisations (including public hospitals controlled by them) to be inspected from time to time,
(e) to recommend to the Minister what sums of money (if any) should be paid from money appropriated from the Consolidated Fund in any financial year to any public health organisation,
(f) to enter into performance agreements with public health organisations, to review the results of organisations under such agreements and to report those results (and make recommendations about the results) to the Minister,
(f1) to give directions to statutory health organisations,
(g) such other functions as may be conferred or imposed by or under this Act.

Further, section 113 of the Act provides that the Secretary:
(1) [The Secretary] may inquire into the administration, management and services of any organisation or institution providing health services (other than a public health organisation) if those services are wholly or partly funded with money paid from the Consolidated Fund.
(2) However, the Secretary cannot make any inquiry under this section in respect of a private health facility or nursing home. 
(3) The Secretary may delegate the conduct of any inquiry under this section to any other person.
Note: Section 49 of the Interpretation Act 1987 contains general provisions relating to the delegation of functions. 
(4) Nothing in this section prevents the Secretary inquiring into the administration, management and services of any public health organisation under section 122 (c).

List of directors-general and secretaries of NSW Health

References

External links
Director-General of NSW Health — New South Wales Ministry of Health